Archestratus ( Archestratos) was a harmonic theorist in the Peripatetic tradition and probably lived in the early 3rd century BC.  Little is known of his life and career.  Athenaeus' reference (XIV.634d) to an Archestratus who wrote On auletes (Περὶ αὐλητῶν) in two books is perhaps to him; it is a "rather remote" possibility that he is identical with Archestratus of Syracuse.

Harmonic theory
The most substantial evidence for Archestratus' ideas is in a passage of Porphyry's commentary on Ptolemy's Harmonics, pp. 26–27 Düring (the "<>" are from the original): 

The pyknon is a structure located within a tetrachord.  Despite the forbiddingly technical and "arid" appearance of the doctrines ascribed to Archestratus, Andrew Barker has argued that in fact "they engage with issues of real significance to musicians, and to anyone seeking to understand the resources and strategies of melodic composition."

Connections with philosophy
The final section of the passage cited from Porphyry suggests that Archestratus was interested in philosophical topics including definition, matter and form and "the relative importance of the faculties of sense-perception and reason in musical analysis," a topic that had been debated by Plato (Rep. 530c–531c) and Aristoxenus (with whom Archestratus seems to have been in broad sympathy).

Archestratus' claim that his work "had substantial connections with philosophy" earned him a vicious attack in Philodemus' De musica, since Diogenes of Babylon, Philodemus' chief antagonist in that work, had used Archestratus' ideas in support of his own.  Philodemus' report is as follows (De musica, Book 4 col. 137.13–27 in the Budé edition of D. Delattre = pp. 91–92 Kemke):

Archestratus may have hoped to show that specialized sciences such as harmonics were entitled to the serious attention of philosophers in general, but the schools of Hellenistic philosophy were largely immune to this suggestion.

References

Sources
 

3rd-century BC Greek people
Ancient Greek music theorists
Peripatetic philosophers